Papaver rupifragum var. atlanticum, the Moroccan poppy or Spanish poppy, also known as Papaver atlanticum, the Atlas poppy, is variety of Papaver rupifragum, a species of poppy.

It is a perennial plant with basal rosettes of bluish leaves and pale orange flowers on long, wiry stems.

References

rupifragum var. atlanticum